Omar Mbwana Zonga is a Kenyan politician. He belongs to the Orange Democratic Movement and was elected to represent the Msambweni Constituency in the National Assembly of Kenya since the 2007 Kenyan parliamentary election.

References

Members of the National Assembly (Kenya)
Living people
Year of birth missing (living people)
Orange Democratic Movement politicians